Haparanda Archipelago National Park is a national park in Haparanda Municipality, Norrbotten County, Sweden.

The park covers part of the Haparanda archipelago in the northeast of the Bothnian Bay near the border with Finland.
There are two relatively large islands, Sandskär and Seskar Furö, and several smaller islands and reefs.
The park is to the west of the Finnish Perämeri National Park.

All of the islands in the Haparanda archipelago have emerged in the last 1,500 years or so, as the bed of the bay has risen due to post-glacial rebound following the last ice age.
The water surrounding the islands is shallow, making it difficult to land.
The islands are typified by large dunes.

References

External links 
 Sweden's National Parks: Haparanda Skärgård National Park from the Swedish Environmental Protection Agency

National parks of Sweden
Geography of Norrbotten County
Protected areas established in 1995
1995 establishments in Sweden
Tourist attractions in Norrbotten County